is a passenger railway station in the city of Kamogawa, Chiba Prefecture, Japan, operated by East Japan Railway Company (JR East).

Lines

Station layout
The station consists of two opposed side platforms connected by a  footbridge. The station is unattended.

Platform

History
Awa-Amatsu Station opened on 15 April 1929. The station was absorbed into the JR East network upon the privatization of Japanese National Railways (JNR) on 1 April 1987.

Passenger statistics
In fiscal 2018, the station was used by an average of 132 passengers daily (boarding passengers only).

Surrounding area
  National Route 128

Bus terminal
There is in front of the station and also has waiting room.

Nitto Kotsu
For Awa-Kamogawa Station
For Kazusa-Okitsu Station
Kamogawa City Community Bus
For Seichoji or Okuseicho

See also
 List of railway stations in Japan

References

External links

  

Railway stations in Chiba Prefecture
Stations of East Japan Railway Company
Railway stations in Japan opened in 1929
Sotobō Line
Kamogawa, Chiba